ABC 40 may refer to one of the following television stations in the United States:

Current
KHBS in Fort Smith, Arkansas
KRHD-CD in Bryan/College Station, Texas
WGGB-TV in Springfield, Massachusetts
WOTV in Battle Creek, Michigan
WWSB in Sarasota, Florida

Former
KCCC-TV in Sacramento, California (1953 to 1957)
KDUB-TV (now KFXB-TV) in Dubuque, Iowa (1970 to 1974 and 1976 to 1995)
WJSU (now WGWW) in Anniston, Alabama (1996 to 2014)
Was a satellite station of WBMA-LD in Birmingham, Alabama